Mabvuku High School is a high school in the Mabvuku suburb of Harare, Zimbabwe.

The school is co-educational for all forms up to A Level students. It opened in 1975 and is one of three schools in Mabvuku offering A level. Mabvuku High School introduced A level in 1988. The current headmaster is Mr Mbirimi and deputy Mr S Marangwanda. The school also carries evening studies.

Mabvuku High School is also known for its A level dance and music group called the Vabvuwi, named after the popular Methodist Church Vabvuwi musical group. The school holds a yearly event called the Arts Night, with live band performances, marimba, dance and drama. Athlete Marshal Munetsi, who is currently in the French league, attended the school.

References

High schools in Zimbabwe
Co-educational schools in Zimbabwe
Day schools in Zimbabwe
Schools in Harare
1975 establishments in Rhodesia
Educational institutions established in 1975